SV Venray is a football club from Venray, Limburg, Netherlands. Venray will be playing in the Sunday Eerste Klasse B (6th tier) in the 2021–22 season.

Venray became champions of the 1988–89 Sunday Hoofdklasse C. At that time, the Hoofdklasse was the highest tier of Dutch amateur football.

Venray also won the 1987 KNVB District Cup in the Zuid 2 (South 2) District. The club went on to win the 1987 KNVB Amateur Cup.

References

External links
 Official site

Football clubs in the Netherlands
1945 establishments in the Netherlands
Association football clubs established in 1945
Football clubs in Limburg (Netherlands)
Sport in Venray